Ildemaro Sánchez (born 7 February 1954) is a Venezuelan fencer. He competed in the individual sabre event at the 1984 Summer Olympics.

References

External links
 

1954 births
Living people
Venezuelan male sabre fencers
Olympic fencers of Venezuela
Fencers at the 1984 Summer Olympics